Anielin Swędowski is a village in the administrative district of Gmina Stryków, within Zgierz County, Łódź Voivodeship, in central Poland.

References

Villages in Zgierz County